Andrey Ivanovich Dikiy (real surname Zankevich;  February 9, 1893 – September 4, 1977) was a Russian writer, white emigre politician and journalist, and a member of the Vlasov movement, known for his antisemitism and anti-Ukrainian sentiment. Dikiy has been described by Christian essayist Dmitry Talantsev as one of the main theorists of Judophobia.

Biography 
Zankevich was born into a noble family, at the family estate in the village of Gaivoron, Chernigov Obl. 30 km south of Konotop (now in Ukraine). His father was an owner of a large sugar factory and sugar beet plantation. His mother's maiden name was Kandiba. Andrey had three brothers and one sister.

He emigrated to Yugoslavia in the aftermath of the Russian Revolution. There he was active in the anti-Soviet community, and was a member of the executive committee of National Alliance of Russian Solidarists. During World War II, Dikiy volunteered for the Nazi collaborationist Russian Liberation Army, and was deputy head of the personnel department of the Civil Administration of the Committee for the Liberation of the Peoples of Russia.

He moved to the United States after World War II and was a prolific publisher of articles in the Russophone press characterized as pseudo-scientific, antisemitic and anti-Ukrainian. His writings were extensively used by Aleksandr Solzhenitsyn in his tract Two Hundred Years Together.

He died on September 4, 1977, in New York and is buried at the Russian Orthodox cemetery at the Novo-Diveevo Cemetery in Nanuet, New York.

References

Bibliography 
 Неизвращённая история Украины-Руси: В 2 томах. Нью-Йорк.
 Евреи в России и СССР: Исторический очерк. Нью-Йорк, 1967.
 Русско-еврейский диалог.

External links 
 Андрей Иванович Занкевич — Андрей Дикий.
Andrew Ivanovich Zankevich Diky at Find a Grave

1893 births
1977 deaths
People from Chernihiv Oblast
People from Chernigov Governorate
National Alliance of Russian Solidarists members
Russian collaborators with Nazi Germany
Russian Liberation Army personnel
Nobility from the Russian Empire
Anti-communists from the Russian Empire
White Russian emigrants to Yugoslavia
Yugoslav emigrants to the United States
Burials at Novo-Diveevo Russian Cemetery
People from Richmond, Maine
Antisemitism in Russia